The Brunk Farmstead is a historic farm located on KOA Campground Road  south of East Lake Drive near Rochester, Illinois. George Brunk, an early settler of Sangamon County, established the farm in the 1820s; the farm is one of the few surviving properties from the county's early settlement. The farmhouse was built as a one-story stone structure circa 1829; its second story was added in the 1850s, giving it an I-house plan. While the house originally had a mainly Federal design, it was later updated with Greek Revival and Italianate influences. The original horse barn, the other historically significant building on the property, is a three-bay English barn built in the late 1820s.

The farm was added to the National Register of Historic Places on December 17, 1999.

References

Farms on the National Register of Historic Places in Illinois
Federal architecture in Illinois
Greek Revival houses in Illinois
Italianate architecture in Illinois
I-houses in Illinois
National Register of Historic Places in Sangamon County, Illinois